Heliothis belladonna is a moth of the family Noctuidae. It is found in North America, including Washington.

External links
Images

Heliothis
Moths described in 1881